Cosmopterix emmolybda is a moth in the family Cosmopterigidae. It was described by Edward Meyrick in 1914. It is found in Malawi.

References

Moths described in 1914
epismaragda